The 1969 Women's World Outdoor Bowls Championship  was held at the Elizabethan Bowls Club in Rockdale, Sydney, New South Wales, Australia, from 4–12 December 1969. 

The event was organised by the newly affiliated International Women's Bowling Board in 1969 without the British Isles as members. This resulted in a first International Tournament with just six nations taking part. Gladys Doyle won the singles which was held in a round robin format. 
The pairs, triples and fours Gold and Taylor trophies all went to South Africa.

Medallists

Results

Women's singles – round robin

Women's pairs – round robin

+ more shots

Women's triples – round robin

+ more shots

Women's fours – round robin

Taylor Trophy

References

World Outdoor Bowls Championship
Bowls in Australia
Sports competitions in Sydney
1969 in Australian sport
World
December 1969 sports events in Australia